Getik (formerly, Chaykend and Ghai-kend) is a town in the Vayots Dzor Province of Armenia.

See also
 Vayots Dzor Province

References 

Populated places in Vayots Dzor Province